Lawrence Waukechon Johnson (March 28, 1909 – September 3, 1972) was an American football player.  He played professionally in the National Football League (NFL) for the Boston/Washington Redskins and the New York Giants.  Johnson played college football at the Haskell Institute—now known as Haskell Indian Nations University.

References

1909 births
1972 deaths
American football ends
American football centers
American football linebackers
Boston Redskins players
New York Giants players
Washington Redskins players
Haskell Indian Nations Fighting Indians football players
People from Ashland County, Wisconsin
Players of American football from Wisconsin